Marci Francisco (born April 22, 1950) is an American politician who currently serves as the Kansas State Senator from the 2nd district, a position she has held since 2005.

Early career
She was a city commissioner of Lawrence, Kansas, from 1979 to 1983, and served as mayor from 1981 to 1983. She was a space analyst at the University of Kansas.

Political career
In 2004, she defeated Mark Buhler, the appointed Republican incumbent, with 49% of the vote, versus 43% for Buhler. Jim Mullins of the Reform party finished third, with 7%. In 2008, she defeated Republican Scott Morgan, 21,069 to 12,540 votes. In 2012, her margin was 64.5% over Republican Ron Ellis 35.4%. In 2016, her margin was 66.1% over Republican Meredith Richey's 33.8%.

Francisco was the Democratic nominee for Kansas State Treasurer in 2018, finishing second, with 42.26% of the vote.

References

1950 births
21st-century American politicians
21st-century American women politicians
Democratic Party Kansas state senators
Living people
Mayors of places in Kansas
Politicians from Lawrence, Kansas
Women mayors of places in Kansas
Women state legislators in Kansas
University of Kansas alumni